Bite Me is a 2019 American romantic comedy film  directed by Meredith Edwards and written by Naomi McDougall Jones. The film stars Christian Coulson, Naomi McDougall Jones, Annie Golden and Naomi Grossman. The film premiered at the Cinequest Film Festival.

Premise
The film is a subversive romantic comedy about a real-life vampire and the IRS agent who audits her.

Cast
 Christian Coulson as James
 Naomi McDougall Jones as Sarah
 Annie Golden as Faith
 Naomi Grossman as Chrissy
 Harold Surratt as Tim
 Mahira Kakkar as Lily
 Cynthia Mace as Nan
 Katherine Kahrs as Lindsay Bolt

Release
Bite Me releases in the form of a 51-screening, 40-city, 3-month, RV-fueled, Joyful Vampire Tour of America from May 6-August 1, 2019.

References

External links

 

2019 films
Vampire comedy films
American vampire films
American comedy horror films
2010s English-language films
2010s American films